AKS Inc, was an American manufacturer of composite aircraft propellers. The company was based in Portland Oregon

The company produced two lines of ground adjustable propellers, the Techno Prop intended for use on small four stroke engines such and the Rotax 912 and 914 and the Sport Prop for smaller engines, including the two-stroke Rotax 503 and the four-stroke HKS 700E.

See also
List of aircraft propeller manufacturers

References 

Aircraft propeller manufacturers
Aerospace companies of the United States
Defunct companies based in Oregon